Jędrzychów may refer to:

Jędrzychów, Lower Silesian Voivodeship (south-west Poland)
Jędrzychów, Opole Voivodeship (south-west Poland)